John Wallace Eskridge  (January 21, 1924 – February 11, 2013) was an American professional basketball player. He spent one season in the Basketball Association of America (BAA) as a member of the Chicago Stags and the Indianapolis Jets (1948–49). He recruited Hall of Fame basketball player Wilt Chamberlain to the University of Kansas, and designed the "star" logo of the Dallas Cowboys professional football team in the NFL.

Early years
Eskridge was born on January 21, 1924, in Independence, Missouri. He attended William Chrisman High School where he played on the school's basketball team. After graduating high school he began attending Graceland University where he played on the football and basketball teams. He was later inducted into the college's athletic hall of fame. He joined the United States Marine Corps during World War II where he served in the Pacific Theater. During the war he was involved in the battle of Iwo Jima and witnessed both flag raisings.

University and professional athletics
After Eskridge was relieved of duty he started attending the University of Kansas and played on the school's basketball team. Once his professional playing career was over he coached the Atchison High School (Kansas) basketball team to a state championship before he joined the Kansas Jayhawks men's basketball team as their equipment manager and assistant coach under Phog Allen from 1954 to 1959. During his tenure, he recruited Wilt Chamberlain.

In 1959, Eskridge joined the Dallas Cowboys football team as their equipment manager. He was credited with designing the Cowboys' star logo.

Later years
After Eskridge's career with Dallas he moved to Independence, Missouri, where he coached basketball and taught high school for over 20 years. Eskridge died in Independence on February 11, 2013, at the age of 88.

BAA career statistics

Regular season

See also
History of the Dallas Cowboys

References

External links

Jack Eskridge, the Man Who Created the Dallas Cowboys’ Logo, Has Died
Cowboys’ First Equip. Manager, Creator of Star Passes Away

1924 births
2013 deaths
United States Marine Corps personnel of World War II
American men's basketball players
Basketball players from Kansas
Centers (basketball)
Chicago Stags players
Dallas Cowboys personnel
Forwards (basketball)
Graceland Yellowjackets football players
Graceland Yellowjackets men's basketball players
High school basketball coaches in Missouri
Indianapolis Jets players
Kansas Jayhawks men's basketball players
Kansas Jayhawks men's basketball coaches
People from Jefferson County, Kansas
People from Independence, Missouri